Nordmann's greenshank (Tringa guttifer) or the spotted greenshank, is a wader in the large family Scolopacidae, the typical waders.

Description
Breeding adults are boldly marked, with whitish spots and spangling on black upperside; heavily streaked head and upper neck; broad, blackish, crescentic spots on lower neck and breast; and darker lores.

Distribution
The Nordmann's greenshank breeds in eastern Russia along the south-western and northern coasts of the Sea of Okhotsk and on Sakhalin Island. Its non-breeding range is not fully understood, but significant numbers have been recorded in South Korea, mainland China, Hong Kong, and Taiwan on passage, and in Bangladesh, Thailand, Cambodia, Vietnam and Peninsular Malaysia in winter. It has also been recorded on passage or in winter in Japan, North Korea, India, Sri Lanka, Myanmar (which may prove to be an important part of its wintering range), Singapore, the Philippines and Indonesia. There are unconfirmed records from Nepal and Guam (to US). It probably has a population of 500–1,000 individuals. It has been recorded several times on 80-mile beach in Western Australia and most recently an individual was discovered on Cairns Esplanade in Queensland, Australia. It was known to have over-wintered there from December 2020 to May 2021. In mid-December 2021 what is thought to be the same individual bird, returned to Cairns Esplanade.

Taxonomy
It is fairly aberrant and was formerly placed in the monotypic genus Pseudototanus. It is an endangered species, and was not available for molecular analyses in Pereira & Baker's study (2005) of the genus Tringa. It appears closest overall to the semipalmata-flavipes and the stagnatilis-totanus-glareola groups, though it also has some similarities to the greater yellowlegs and common greenshank.

References 

 Birdlife International retrieved 3/1/2007
 Pereira, S. L., & Baker, A. J. (2005). Multiple Gene Evidence for Parallel Evolution and Retention of Ancestral Morphological States in the Shanks (Charadriiformes: Scolopacidae). The Condor 107 (3): 514–526. DOI: 10.1650/0010-5422(2005)107[0514:MGEFPE]2.0.CO;2 abstract
 eBird.org record of first Australian east coast sighting by Adrian Walsh 

Nordmann's greenshank
Birds of North Asia
Nordmann's greenshank
Nordmann's greenshank